Karl Edvin Karlsson  (4 September 1883 – 28 April 1932) was a Swedish politician. He was a member of the Centre Party.

References
This article was initially translated from the Swedish Wikipedia article.

Centre Party (Sweden) politicians
1883 births
1932 deaths
Members of the Första kammaren
People from Gothenburg Municipality